Buffalo, Rochester and Pittsburgh Railroad Station may mean:
Buffalo, Rochester and Pittsburgh Railroad Station (Springville, New York)
Buffalo, Rochester and Pittsburgh Railway Station (Orchard Park, New York)
Buffalo, Rochester & Pittsburgh Railway Indiana Passenger Station, Indiana, Pennsylvania